Disteganthus is a genus of plants in the family Bromeliaceae, subfamily Bromelioideae.  The genus name is from the Greek “dis” (two), “steg” (covering), and “anthos” (flower). They are considered a primitive genus among bromeliads and are only found in terrestrial environments.   Distenganthus has three known species, native to northeastern South America.

Species
 Disteganthus basilateralis Lemaire - French Guiana
 Disteganthus calatheoides (L.B.Sm.) L.B.Sm. & Read - Amapá, French Guiana
 Disteganthus lateralis (L.B. Smith) Gouda - French Guiana, Suriname

References

External links
 Disteganthus photos on FCBS
 BSI Genera Gallery photos

Bromelioideae
Bromeliaceae genera
Flora of South America